Three Wishes is a reality television show that premiered on NBC on September 23, 2005 to December 9, 2005.  It featured contemporary Christian musician Amy Grant as she traveled around the country fulfilling the big wishes and dreams of some needy small-town residents.

The show comes into a town, takes over the town square to take wishes at their "Wish Tent", and then films the episode in the following days. During this time, a free concert and carnival are held at which Amy Grant (and often another artist, such as Hootie and the Blowfish) performs. Though Grant's music was heard in most episodes, it was only through brief excerpts of her live performances and the show's theme song, "Believe", as Grant did not want to use the series to promote her own music. Casting is held well in advance of taking wishes in order to determine suitability for filming at the location.

The series ended after ten episodes due to disappointing ratings. It also aired on CityTV in Canada.

Episodes

References

External links

 
 Three Wishes episode guide

2000s American reality television series
2005 American television series debuts
2005 American television series endings
NBC original programming
Television series by Universal Television